The Boyd and Sallie Gilleland House (now known as Peach Brandy Cottage) is a historic residence in Dawsonville, Georgia. It is located at 3 Shepard's Lane on Georgia Highway 9 (known as Thunder Road because of its use by moonshiners), leading to Atlanta.

Description and history 
The -story, wood-framed Craftsman style bungalow was built in 1929. According to its NRHP description, it is a “side-gable bungalow type with a projecting front-gable roof over the porch and a front-gable dormer.”

The home contained moonshiner Boyd Gilleland's still, used during the era of Prohibition (Prohibition in the United States lasted from 1920 - 1933). The home is on a road leading to Atlanta, and the liquor produced was sold at speakeasies. The family also owned a service station, hardware store and Amicalola Lodge, and Boyd Gilleland was a Dawson County Tax Commissioner and a founder of Dawson County Bank. The house was added to the National Register of Historic Places on May 6, 2009, for its architectural and historical significance.

See also
National Register of Historic Places listings in Dawson County, Georgia

References

Further reading
Gilleland House National Register of Historic Places nomination form

Houses on the National Register of Historic Places in Georgia (U.S. state)
National Register of Historic Places in Dawson County, Georgia
Houses completed in 1929
American Craftsman architecture in Georgia (U.S. state)
Bungalow architecture in Georgia (U.S. state)